Burgenlandkreis is a district in Saxony-Anhalt, Germany.

History 
 
The district was established as Landkreis Burgenland by the merger of the former Burgenlandkreis and Landkreis Weißenfels as part of the reform of 2007. On 16 July 2007, the district parliament decided to change the name to Burgenlandkreis, coming into effect on 1 August 2007.

In 2015 the skeletal remains of an ancient inhabitant of Karsdorf dated from the Early Neolithic (7200 BP) were analyzed; he turned out to belong to the paternal T1a-M70 lineage and maternal lineage H1.

Towns and municipalities 

The Burgenlandkreis consists of the following subdivisions:

Verbandsgemeinden

1 seat of the Verbandsgemeinde; 2 town

References

External links 
 Official website of Burgenlandkreis